The third season began with a small pre-season on February 1, 2010 and consisted on competing teams for money. At the end of this pre-season all the money raised so far was donated to the victims of the earthquake of February 27 that affected Chile.

The new season of Calle 7 started on March 15, 2010, with new players and game mode in couples. Like a previous seasons the nominees were chosen every day according to the team that lost, in this case the couple. The couple with less score of elimination on Friday and was eliminated by a sealed envelope from the beginning of the program knew whether it was male or female.

The grand finale was on June 5 and the winners were the winner of Pelotón Francisco "Pancho" Rodríguez and Maite Orsini, winning 6 million Chilean pesos, the second place was Federico Koch and Camila Nash winning 1 million Chilean pesos. The "Spirit of Calle 7" award was won by Alain Soulat.

Teams

Pre-season

Season 3

Teams competition

introduced the new season and the new contestants
Good Friday, Easter
Easter Week
rejoined as partner of Chapu
replaced by Catalina Vallejos
replaced by Paz
replaced by Eliana
replaced by Federico
Katherine B. had 2 weeks of immunity
Maite talk about her legal problems
nominated by the Yellow team
competed with Paz
nominated because all the Red team was nominated
Eliana threw a shoe at the judge
competed with Daniel
competed with Felipe

Individual competition

none had a partner

Final

chosen by their partners
chosen by the public

Elimination order

External links
 Official website

2010 Chilean television seasons